Roman Vladimirovich Starovoyt (born January 20, 1972) is a Russian politician. He served as deputy Minister of Transport of the Russian Federation and head of the Federal Road Agency in that ministry, and since 2019 he is the Governor of Kursk Oblast. He is member of United Russia party.

Biography
Starovoyt was born on January 20, 1972, in the city of Kursk. His father, Vladimir Aleksandrovich Starovoyt, worked at the Kursk Nuclear Power Plant. In 1974, his father was transferred to the Leningrad NPP, in the city of Sosnovy Bor, Leningrad Region, where Roman spent his childhood.

In 1995, he was the executive director of JSC Regional Investment Agency. In 1995-2001, Starovoyt was General Director of the asset management company NPF Promyshlenny. In 2002–2005, he was the owner and CEO of the construction company Stroyinvest.

From 2005 to 2007, he held the position of Head of the Investor Relations Department of the St. Petersburg Government Investment and Strategic Projects Committee. In 2007–2010, Starovoyt was First Deputy Chairman of the Committee on Investments and Strategic Projects of the Government of St. Petersburg. From 2010 to 2012, he was Deputy Director of the Department of Industry and Infrastructure of the Office of the Government of the Russian Federation.

Since November 22, 2012 he was the head of the Federal Road Agency (Rosavtodor). Since October 1, 2018, he was Deputy Minister of Transport of the Russian Federation.

On October 11, 2018, after the resignation of Alexander Mikhailov, he was appointed interim governor of the Kursk Oblast.

On the 2019 Unified Voting Day September 8, 2019, he won with a result of 81.07% in the first round of elections of the Governor of the Kursk Oblast. His term of office will end in 2024.

In 1995 he graduated from the D. F. Ustinov Baltic State Technical University, majoring in “Pulse heat engines”. In 2008, he graduated from the North-West Academy of Public Administration with a degree in State and Municipal Administration.

In 2012, at the Moscow University of the Ministry of Internal Affairs of Russia, he defended his dissertation for the degree of candidate of pedagogical sciences on the topic "Innovative methodology for training athletes in winter polyathlon"

In 2019, he graduated from the program for the development of the personnel management reserve of the Higher School of Public Administration (ВШГУ) of the RANEPA.

References

1972 births
Living people
1st class Active State Councillors of the Russian Federation
Politicians from Kursk
Governors of Kursk Oblast
United Russia politicians